Ellis Lake is a man-made lake in Marysville, California.

Ellis Lake may also refer to:

Canada
 Ellis Lake (Muskoka District), a lake of Ontario
 Ellis Lake (Priske Township, Thunder Bay District), a lake of Ontario
 Ellis Lake (Timiskaming District)
 Ellis Lake (Parry Sound District), a lake of Ontario
 Ellis Lake (Wabikoba Creek), a lake of Ontario

United States
 A lake in Birch Township, Beltrami County, Minnesota
 A tributary of the Betsie River, Michigan